The Territorial Prelature of Illapel is a territorial prelature located in the city of Illapel in the Ecclesiastical province of La Serena in Chile.

History
 30 April 1960: Established as Territorial Prelature of Illapel from the Metropolitan Archdiocese of La Serena and Diocese of San Felipe

Leadership, in reverse chronological order
 Prelates of Illapel (Roman rite)
 Bishop Jorge Patricio Vega Velasco, S.V.D. (2010.02.20 – present)
 Bishop Rafael de la Barra Tagle, S.V.D. (1989.06.17 – 2010.02.20)
 Bishop Pablo Lizama Riquelme (1985.12.19 – 1988.02.24), appointed Auxiliary Bishop of Talca; future Archbishop
 Bishop Cirilo Polidoro Van Vlierberghe, O.F.M. (1966.06.27 – 1984.08.11)
 Bishop Cirilo Polidoro Van Vlierberghe, O.F.M. (Apostolic Administrator 1960 – 1966.06.27)

Sources
 GCatholic.org
 Catholic Hierarchy
  Prelature website

Roman Catholic dioceses in Chile
Christian organizations established in 1960
Roman Catholic dioceses and prelatures established in the 20th century
Illapel, Territorial Prelature of
Territorial prelatures
1960 establishments in Chile